Number 17A is an abstract expressionist painting by Jackson Pollock. It is owned by hedge fund manager Kenneth C. Griffin, who purchased it in September 2015 from David Geffen for $200 million, a then record-breaking price, at which time it was lent to the Art Institute of Chicago. , it is ranked 5th on the list of most expensive paintings.

The painting is oil paint on fiberboard and is a drip painting, created by splashing paint onto a horizontal surface. It was painted a year after Jackson Pollock introduced his drip technique. The piece was featured in the August 1949 edition of Life that made Jackson Pollock a celebrity.

References

1948 paintings
Abstract expressionism
Paintings by Jackson Pollock